William Jack Malden (14 May 1899 – 23 November 1963) was an English cricketer. Malden was a right-handed batsman.  He played mainly for Sussex County Cricket Club.

Malden was born at Ticehurst in Sussex and educated at Haileybury College where he played cricket for the college team between 1914 and 1917,  captaining it in his final year. He played for Lord's Schools against The Rest in 1917 and was described as a "good batsman who was also a fine field". After World War I he went up on Cambridge University.

His first-class cricket debut for Sussex came against Leicestershire in the 1920 County Championship, He made nine further first-class appearances during the 1920 season. During the 1921 season Malden played his only first-class match for Cambridge University against the British Army as well as making eleven appearances for Sussex He scored his only first-class century during the season against Warwickshire. He made two further appearances for Sussex in the 1922 County Championship against Gloucestershire and Worcestershire.

Malden died at Kingston Warren near Newbury in Berkshire in November 1963 aged 64. His father Eustace Malden also played first-class cricket as did his father's cousin Ernest Malden.

Notes

References

External links

1899 births
1963 deaths
People from Ticehurst
People educated at Haileybury and Imperial Service College
Alumni of the University of Cambridge
English cricketers
Sussex cricketers
Cambridge University cricketers